Willoughby may refer to:
Willoughby, Albemarle County, Virginia, an unincorporated community
Willoughby Spit, a neighborhood in Norfolk